

Legend

List

References

2002-03